Omaha Northwest High Magnet School at 8204 Crown Point Avenue in northwest Omaha, Nebraska, United States, is located on a  campus. Construction was completed in 1971. Further renovations were completed in 2004, adding several classrooms and improving the choral and band facilities. Northwest is one of nine public high schools in the Omaha Public School District.

Special features within the building include an auditorium center, a 2,200 seat gymnasium with two balcony areas for physical education instruction and interscholastic athletics, and the latest equipment for students in specialized areas such as computer technology, art, business, mathematics, industrial technology and science.  However, while the school has swim teams, the building has no pool.

Northwest's colors are scarlet, navy, and old gold.  Its mascot is the Husky.

The current principal of Omaha Northwest High Magnet is Dr. Kimberly Jackson.

Athletics

State championships

Notable alumni

 Tyrie Ballard, cast member on The Real World: Denver
 Damon Benning, former Nebraska Cornhuskers running back (class of 1992)
 John Carroll, member of Survivor: Marquesas
 Ron Kellogg, former NBA player and former Kansas Jayhawks basketball star
 Zach Kroenke, former MLB player (Arizona Diamondbacks and Washington Nationals)
 Kevyn Morrow, actor
 Gregg Olson, former Major League Baseball American League Rookie of the Year in 1989
 Shane Powers, contestant on Survivor: Panama
 Lee Terry, United States House of Representatives congressman
 Harold Waddell, 2006, 2007, 2008 and 2009 NAHA Pro Hillclimb national champion (class of 2000)
 Timothy Prince and Thomas Prince former college basketball players Iowa and Southeast Juco class of 1984
 Patrick Peirce former college baseball player: Indian Hills CC class of 1982 comedian-writer

See also
 Omaha Public Schools

References

External links
 
 Omaha Northwest's Official Alumni Association site

Omaha Public Schools
High schools in Omaha, Nebraska
Educational institutions established in 1971
Public high schools in Nebraska
Magnet schools in Nebraska
1971 establishments in Nebraska